Tetragonoderus dilatatus is a species of beetle in the family Carabidae. It was described by Wiedemann in 1823.

References

dilatatus
Beetles described in 1823